The Regattas of San Francisco is a 1960 French film directed by Claude Autant-Lara.

There was a dispute between the producer, Raoul Levy, and the director, Claude Autant-Lara when the former insisted on making cuts to the movie. This resulted in the latter trying to take his name off the film.

References

External links

French drama films
1960 films
Films directed by Claude Autant-Lara
1960s French films